The women's 400m T54 event at the 2008 Summer Paralympics took place at the Beijing National Stadium on 12 September. There were two heats; the first 3 in each heat (Q) plus the 2 fastest other times (q) qualified.

Results

Heats
Competed from 18:48.

Heat 1

Heat 2

Final
Competed at 20:08.

Q = qualified for final by place. q = qualified by time.

References
 
 

W
2008 in women's athletics